All the Right Moves may refer to:

Film and television
 All the Right Moves (film), a 1983 American film starring Tom Cruise
 All the Right Moves, a 2012 American reality TV series starring Travis Wall
 All the Right Moves, a British TV programme presented by Quentin Willson
 "All the Right Moves" (Dawson's Creek), a television episode

Music
 "All the Right Moves" (Jennifer Warnes and Chris Thompson song), from the soundtrack of the film, 1983
 "All the Right Moves" (OneRepublic song), 2009
 "All the Right Moves", a song by Bury Your Dead from Cover Your Tracks
 "All the Right Moves", a song by David Hasselhoff from Night Rocker
 "All the Right Moves", a song by Kick Axe from Vices
 All the Right Moves, a "gonzo opera" with a libretto by Thomas Bullene Woodward

Books
 All the Right Moves: A Guide to Crafting Breakthrough Strategy, a 2000 book by Constantinos C. Markides
 All the Right Moves: A VLSI Architecture for Chess, a Ph.D. thesis by Carl Ebeling